Articles related to Egypt include:

0-9
First Dynasty of Egypt through the Achaemenid Empire (Thirty-first Dynasty of Egypt)

A
Aaru - Ababda - Abaza Family - Abbas I of Egypt - Abbas II of Egypt - Abbasid Caliphate - Fifi Abdou - Pope Abraham of Alexandria - Abu Gorab - Abu Hafs al-Masri Brigades - Abu Qir - Abu Qir Bay - Abu Simbel - Abusir - Abydos, Egypt - Abyssinian (cat) - Achaemenid Empire - Adze - Aegyptus - Africa - African Union - Muhammad Ahmad - Ahmes - Queen Ahmose - Ahmose-Nefertari - Ahmose, son of Ebana - Aker (god) - Akhenaten - Akhnaten (opera) - Al-Ahram - Al-Azhar University - Alexander the Great - Alexander Helios - Alexandria - Alexandria Regional Center for Women's Health and Development - Alexandrian text-type - Mohamed Al-Fayed - Al-Gama'a al-Islamiyya - Alhazen - Hassan Allam -  Al-Qurn - Amarna - Amarna art - Amarna letters - Amasis II - Ambrose of Alexandria - Amduat - Ammit - Ammon - Amr Diab - Amr Moussa - Amun - Amunet - 'Anat in Egypt - Ancient Egypt - Ancient Egyptian astronomy - Ancient Egyptian funerary texts - Ancient Egyptian royal titulary - Ancient Egyptian medicine - Ancient Egyptian religion - Ancient Near East - Andjety - Ankh -Ankhesenamen - Ankhesenpaaten Tasherit - Ankt - Anti (mythology) - Mark Antony - Antony and Cleopatra - Anubis - Anuket - Apep - Apis (Egyptian mythology) - Apries - ArabDev - Arish - Arsinoe (Gulf of Suez) - Arsinoe I of Egypt - Arsinoe II of Egypt - Arsinoe III of Egypt - Arsinoe IV of Egypt - Arsinoe of Macedonia - Ash (god) - Astrology in Hellenistic Egypt - Aswan - Aswan Dam - Asyut - Aten - Atenism - Athanasius of Alexandria - Atum - Avaris

B
Babi (mythology) - Badari - Baggush Box - Bahariya Oasis - Bakenranef - Ba-Pef - Sidi Barrani - Bastet (mythology) - Bat (goddess) - Bata (god) - Battle of Actium - Battle of Alexandria (1801) - Battle of Kadesh - Battle of Megiddo (15th century BC) - Battle of Navarino - Battle of the Nile - Seuserenre Bebiankh - Bedouin - Benben - Beni Hasan - Bennu - Bent Pyramid - Berenice I of Egypt - Berenice II - Berenice III of Egypt - Bes - Bibliotheca Alexandrina - Bintanath - Block statue (Egyptian) - Book of the Dead - Book of Gates - Boundary Stelae of Akhenaten - James Henry Breasted - Brook of Egypt - Bubastis - Buhen - List of burials in the Valley of the Kings - Busiris (Lower Egypt) - Buto

C
Caesarion - Cairo - Cairo Geniza - Cairo Metro - Cairo Tower - Cambyses II of Persia - Camp David Accords - Canopic jar - Canopus, Egypt - Decree of Canopus - Howard Carter (archaeologist) - Cartouche - Cataracts of the Nile - Youssef Chahine - Jean-François Champollion - Chancellor Bay - Chapelle Rouge - Chariot - Chem - Chensit - Chenti-cheti - Children of Gebelawi - Cinema of Egypt - Cleitarchus - Clement of Alexandria - Cleopatra (1934 film) - Cleopatra (1963 film) - Cleopatra (1999 film) - Cleopatra I of Egypt - Cleopatra II of Egypt - Cleopatra III of Egypt - Cleopatra IV of Egypt - Cleopatra V of Egypt - Cleopatra VI of Egypt - Cleopatra VII - Cleopatra Selene of Syria - Cleopatra Selene II - Cleopatra Thea - Climate of Egypt - Codex Sinaiticus - Coffin Texts - Colossi of Memnon - Communications in Egypt - Constantin-François Chassebœuf - Conventional Egyptian chronology - Coptic alphabet - Coptic architecture - Coptic art - Coptic Cairo - Coptic language - Coptic literature - Coptic monasticism - Coptic Orthodox Church of Alexandria - Coptic placenames - Corniche - Corvée - Crocodilopolis - Culture of Egypt - Cusae - Cyrenaica - Cyril of Alexandria

D
Dahshur - Dahshur boats - François-Paul Brueys d'Aigalliers - Dakhla Oasis - Dalida - Damnatio memoriae - Danaus chrysippus - Darius I of Persia - Darius II of Persia - Darius the Great's Suez Inscriptions - DB320 - Dedun - Deir el-Bahri - Deir el-Medina - Demographics of Egypt - Demotic (Egyptian) - Den (Pharaoh) - Divine Adoratrice of Amun - Djed - Djedefptah - Djedefre - Djediufankh - Djedkare Isesi - Djedptahiufankh - Djehuti - Djer - Djet - Djoser - Pyramid of Djoser - Bernardino Drovetti - Duat - Dudimose

E
Earl of Carnarvon - Early Dynastic Period of Egypt - Georg Ebers - Ebers Papyrus - Economy of Egypt - Edfu -  Eftekasat - Egypt - Egypt–Ethiopia relations - Egypt (Roman province) - The Egyptian - Egyptian Arabic - Egyptian astrology (disambiguation) - Egyptian astronomy - Egyptian calendar - Egyptian chronology - Egyptian Civil Code - Egyptian cuisine - Egyptian diaspora - Egyptian faience - Egyptian Fourth Dynasty family tree - Egyptian hieroglyphs - Egyptian Islamic Jihad - Egyptian–Israeli Peace Treaty - Egyptian language - Egyptian mathematics - Egyptian Museum - Egyptian numerals - Egyptian pyramids - Egyptian Revival architecture - Egyptian Sand Sea - Egyptian soul - Egyptians - List of Egyptologists - Egyptology - Eighth Dynasty of Egypt - Eighteenth Dynasty of Egypt - El Alamein - Mohamed ElBaradei - El Hiba - El Kab - El-Lahun - El-Mahalla El-Kubra - Elephantine - Elephantine papyri - Eleventh Dynasty of Egypt - Embalming - Ennead - Eratosthenes - Esna - Euclid - Exodus - Exodus Decoded - Eye of Horus

F
Faience - Faiyum - Family tree of the Eighteenth Dynasty of Egypt - Farafra, Egypt - Farouk of Egypt - Fatimid Caliphate - Dodi Fayed - Fifteenth Dynasty of Egypt - Fifth Dynasty of Egypt - First Battle of El Alamein - First Dynasty of Egypt - First Intermediate Period of Egypt - Foreign relations of Egypt - Four sons of Horus - Fourteenth Dynasty of Egypt - Fourth Dynasty of Ancient Egypt - Fuad I of Egypt - Fuad II of Egypt - Fustat

G
Gabal Edmonstone - Gamal Abdel Nasser - Gates of Cairo - Geb - Geography of Egypt - Geriatric medicine in Egypt - Gerzeh - Gilukhipa - Giza - Giza Necropolis - God's Wife of Amun - Land of Goshen - Governorates of Egypt - Great Hymn to the Aten - Great Pyramid of Giza - Great Sphinx of Giza

H
Mamdouh Habib - Hapy - Harsiese A - Harsiese B - Hathor - Hatmehit - Hatshepsut - Hawara - Zahi Hawass - Hedetet - Heqet - Heka (god) - Heliopolis (ancient and modern) - Hemen - Hemiunu - Hemsut - Herakleopolis Magna - Herihor - Hermanubis - Hesat - Hetepheres II - Hieratic - History of ancient Egypt - History of Arab Egypt - History of Egypt - History of Egypt under the Muhammad Ali dynasty - History of modern Egypt - History of Ottoman Egypt - History of Persian Egypt - History of the Middle East - Horemheb - Horus - Soad Hosny - Huh (god) - Huni - Hurghada - Hyksos - Hypatia of Alexandria

I
Salima Ikram - Imhotep - Imiut fetish - Imyremeshaw - Ineni - Intef I - Intef II - Intef III - Intef VI - Intef VII - Ipuwer Papyrus - Iry-Hor - Isetnofret - Ishara - Isis - Islamic Cairo - Itjtawy - ITWorx - Iunit - Iuput I - Iuput II

J
Jebel Barkal

K
Ka - Karnak - Kashta - Kebechet - Khafre - Pyramid of Khafre - Kharga Oasis - Kemet - Khentkaus II - Khepri - Khnum - Khonsu - Kiya - Kneph - Kohl (cosmetics) - Kom Ombo - Temple of Kom Ombo - Umm Kulthum - Kingdom of Kush - Valley of the Kings - KV1 - KV2 -KV3 - KV4 - KV5 - KV6 - KV7 - KV9 - KV14 - KV17 - KV20 - KV34 - KV35 - KV39 - KV42 - KV43 - KV46 - KV55 - KV60 - KV62

L
Lake Mariout - Lake Nasser - Miles Lampson, 1st Baron Killearn - Land of Goshen - Land of Punt - Late Egyptian - Late Period of ancient Egypt - S. H. Leeder - Leonardo da Vinci Art Institute - Leontopolis - Karl Richard Lepsius - LGBT rights in Egypt (Gay rights) - Library of Alexandria - Libyan Desert - Lisht - List of ancient Egyptian sites - List of cities in Egypt - List of Coptic Orthodox Popes of Alexandria -  List of ancient Egyptian dynasties - List of Egyptians - List of Greek Orthodox Patriarchs of Alexandria - List of pharaohs - List of solar deities - Long Range Desert Group - Luxor - Luxor Museum - Luxor Temple

M
Maahes - Ma'at - Maat Kheru - Mafdet - Naguib Mahfouz - Étienne-Louis Malus - Mamluk - Manetho - Auguste Mariette - Mark the Evangelist - Gaston Maspero - Masrena - Mastaba - Pope Matthew I of Alexandria - Medinet Habu (location) - Medinet Habu (temple) - Mediterranean Sea - Meidum - Memphis, Egypt - Mendes - Menes - Menhit - Menkaura - Pyramid of Menkaure - Meret - Meretseger - Meritamen - Meritaten - Merneferre Ay - Merneith - Merneptah - Merneptah Stele - Mersa Matruh - Meshwesh - Meskhenet - Middle East - Middle Kingdom of Egypt - Milan Papyrus - Military history of Egypt during World War II - Military of Egypt - Min (god) - Minya, Egypt - Mizraim - Mnewer - Prince Muhammad Abdel Moneim - Monthu - Mortuary Temple of Amenhotep III - Moses - Mouled Sidi El-Latini - Mount Sinai - Gamal Mubarak - Hosni Mubarak - Mummification Museum - Mummy - Muslim Brotherhood - Mut - Myth of Osiris and Isis

N
Nabta Playa - Nag Hammadi - Nag Hammadi library - Muhammad Naguib - Mustafa el-Nahhas - Napata - Napoleonic Campaign in Egypt - Naqada - Narmer - Gamal Abdel Nasser - Nebiriau II - Necho I - Necho II - List of necropoleis - Nectanebo I - Nectanebo II - Neferefre - Neferhotep I - Neferhotep III - Neferirkare Kakai - Neferkare, ninth dynasty - Nefertari - Nefertem - Nefertiti - Nehebkau - Neith - Nekhbet - Nekhen - Neper (mythology) - Nephthys - Neter-khertet - New Kingdom - Nile - Nile crocodile - Nile Delta - Nile Level Texts - Nile perch - Nilometer - Nilo-Saharan languages - Nineteenth Dynasty of Egypt - Nineteenth Dynasty of Egypt family tree  - Ninth Dynasty of Egypt - Nitocris - Nomarch - Nome (Egypt) - North Africa - Nu (mythology) -Nubia - Nubian languages - Nut (goddess) - Nymphaea - Nymphaea caerulea - Nymphaea lotus - Nynetjer - Nyuserre Ini

O
Obelisk - Richard O'Connor - Ogdoad - Old Kingdom - Old Winter Palace Hotel, Luxor - Opening of the mouth ceremony - Operation Compass - Opet Festival - Origen - Osiris - Osiris-Dionysus - Osorkon the Elder - Osorkon I - Osorkon II - Osorkon III - Osorkon IV - Ostracon - Oxyrhynchus - Oxyrhynchus Gospels - Ozymandias

P
Pachomius - Pakhet - Palestine - Pami - Pantheon (gods) - Papyrus - Papyrus Harris I - Papyrus of Ani - Tewfik Pasha - Passage of the Red Sea - Pedubast I - Pelusium - Pepi I Meryre - Pepi II Neferkare - Petbe - Pope Peter I of Alexandria - Flinders Petrie - Pharaoh - Philae - Philip III of Macedon - Phoenix (mythology) - Piankh - Pi-hahiroth - Pinedjem I - Piye - Politics of Egypt - Polybus (King of Thebes) - Port Safaga - Port Said - Precinct of Amun-Re - Precinct of Mut - Predynastic Egypt - Princess Fawzia Fuad of Egypt - Protodynastic Period of Egypt - Psammuthes - Psamtik I - Psamtik II - Psamtik III - Pschent - Psusennes I - Psusennes II - Psusennes III - Ptah - Ptahhotep - Ptolemaic dynasty - History of Ptolemaic Egypt - Ptolemy - Ptolemy I Soter - Ptolemy II Philadelphus - Ptolemy III Euergetes - Ptolemy IV Philopator - Decree of Memphis (Ptolemy IV) - Ptolemy V Epiphanes - Ptolemy VI Philometor - Ptolemy VII Neos Philopator - Ptolemy VIII Physcon - Ptolemy IX Lathyros - Ptolemy X Alexander I - Ptolemy XI Alexander II - Ptolemy XII Auletes - Ptolemy XIII Theos Philopator - Ptolemy XIV of Egypt - Land of Punt - Pylon (architecture) - Pyramid - Bent Pyramid - Egyptian pyramids - Pyramid of Djoser - Pyramid of Khafre - Pyramid of Menkaure - Red Pyramid - Step pyramid - Pyramid of Unas - Pyramid Texts - Pyramidion - Pyramidology

Q
Qa'a - Qakare Ibi - Qattara Depression - Qetesh - Qubbet el-Hawa - Queen Ahmose - Queen consort - Valley of the Queens - QV44 - QV66

R
Ra - Rahab - Ramesses II - Ramesses III - Ramesses IV - Ramesses V - Ramesses VI - Ramesses VII - Ramesses VIII - Ramesses IX - Ramesses X - Ramesses XI - Ramesseum - Raneb - Ras Muhammad National Park - Red Pyramid - Red Sea - Reformed Egyptian - Relief - Religion in Egypt - Renenutet - Renpet - Renseneb - Resheph - Rhind Mathematical Papyrus - Rhinocorura - River delta - David Rohl - Erwin Rommel - Rosetta - Rosetta Stone - Rosicrucian Egyptian Museum - Royal Wadi and tombs - Rudamun - Rylands Library Papyrus P52

S
Mohamed Saad (actor) - Anwar El Sadat - Sahara - Sahure - Saint Catherine's Monastery - Sais, Egypt - Salec - Abd El-Razzak El-Sanhuri - Saqqara - Sarcophagus - Satet - Scarabaeidae - Scaraboid seal - Scribe - Season of the Emergence - Season of the Harvest - Season of the Inundation - Second Battle of El Alamein - Second Dynasty of Egypt - Second Intermediate Period of Egypt - Sed festival - Sehel Island - Seked - Seker - Sekhmet - Senenmut - Senet - Serabit el-Khadim - Serapeum - Serekh - Serket - Set (mythology) - Seventeenth Dynasty of Egypt - Seventh Dynasty of Egypt - Shai - Omar Sharif - Sharm el-Sheikh - Shasu - Shen ring - Pope Shenouda III of Alexandria - Sherden - Shezmu - Shittah-tree - Shoshenq I - Shu (Egyptian deity) - Sia (god) - Sinai Peninsula - Sistrum - Siwa Oasis - Siwi language - Six-Day War - Sixteenth Dynasty of Egypt - Sixth Dynasty of Egypt - Smenkhkare - Edwin Smith Papyrus - Sneferu - Sobek - Sobekneferu - Solar deity - Sopdet - Sopdu - Southern Tomb 25 - Speos Artemidos - Sphinx - Stargate - Stele - Stella (beer) - Step pyramid - Story of Sinuhe - Story of Wenamun - Strabo - Suez - Suez Canal - Suez Crisis - Syenite - Syriac language

T
Taba, Egypt - Tadukhipa - Taharqa - Tahpanhes - Takelot I - Takelot II - Takelot III - Talatat - Tamer Hosny - Tanis, Egypt - Tantamani - Senakhtenre Tao I - Seqenenre Tao II - Taweret - Tefnakht - Tefnut - Temple of Kom Ombo - Tenenet - Tenth Dynasty of Egypt - Teti - Mohammed Ali Tewfik - Tewfik Pasha - Tey - The Egyptian - The Ten Commandments (1956 film) - Theban Mapping Project - Theban Necropolis - Thebes, Egypt - Thesh - Third Dynasty of Egypt - Third Intermediate Period of Egypt - Thirteenth Dynasty of Egypt - Thirtieth Dynasty of Egypt - Thoth - Thutmose (prince) - Thutmose (18th-dynasty vizier) - Thutmose (19th-dynasty vizier) - Tuthmose (Viceroy of Kush) - Thutmose (sculptor) - Thutmose I - Thutmose II - Thutmose III - Thutmose IV - Tiye - Tjuyu - Tombs of the Nobles (Amarna) - Tombs of the Nobles (Luxor) - Transliteration of Ancient Egyptian - Transport in Egypt - TT71 - Turin King List - Tutankhamun - Tutankhamun and the Daughter of Ra - Tutkheperre Shoshenq - Twelfth Dynasty of Egypt - Twelfth Dynasty of Egypt family tree - Twentieth Dynasty of Egypt - Twentieth Dynasty of Egypt family tree - Twenty-first Dynasty of Egypt - Twenty-first Dynasty of Egypt family tree - Twenty-second Dynasty of Egypt - Twenty-first Dynasty of Egypt family tree - Twenty-third Dynasty of Egypt - Twenty-fourth Dynasty of Egypt - Twenty-fifth Dynasty of Egypt - Twenty-sixth Dynasty of Egypt - Twenty-eighth Dynasty of Egypt - Twenty-ninth Dynasty of Egypt - Twosret

U
Umm Kulthum - Umm el-Qa'ab - Unas - Pyramid of Unas - Unfinished obelisk - United Arab Republic - Unut - Upper and Lower Egypt - Uraeus - Userkaf - Userkare - Ushabti

V
Valley of the Kings - Valley of the Queens - Via della Vittoria - Via Maris - Vizier (Ancient Egypt)

W
Wadjet - Wagh El-Birket - Wahibre Ibiau - Wahkare Khety I - Wazner - Waste Management in Egypt - Water resources management in modern Egypt - Water supply and sanitation in Egypt - Kent R. Weeks - Wegaf - Story of Wenamun - Weneg (Egyptian deity) - Weneg (pharaoh) - Wepwawet - Werethekau - West Nile virus - Westcar Papyrus - Western Desert Force - Old Winter Palace Hotel, Luxor - Women in Ancient Egypt - Workmen's Village, Amarna - Wosret - WV22 - WV23 - WV25

X
Xerxes I of Persia - Xerxes II of Persia

Y
Yaqub-Har - Yom Kippur War - Thomas Young (scientist) - Yuya

Z
Zagazig - Zahi Hawass - Zawyet el'Aryan - Ahmed Zewail

See also

 
 
 :Category:Egypt-related lists

 
Egypt